The Coptic Orthodox Church, also known as the Coptic Orthodox Patriarchate of Alexandria, is an Oriental Orthodox Christian church based in Egypt, serving Africa and the Middle East. The head of the church and the See of Alexandria is the Pope of Alexandria on the Holy Apostolic See of Saint Mark, who also carries the title of Father of fathers, Shepherd of shepherds, Ecumenical Judge and the 13th among the Apostles. The See of Alexandria is titular. The Coptic Pope presides from Saint Mark's Coptic Orthodox Cathedral in the Abbassia District in Cairo. The church follows the Coptic Rite for its liturgy, prayer and devotional patrimony. Christians in Egypt total about four million people, and Coptic Christians make up Egypt’s largest and most significant minority population, and the largest population of Christians in the Middle East.

Coptic Orthodox tradition claims that the Coptic Church was established by Mark, an apostle and evangelist, during the middle of the 1st century (c. AD 42). Due to disputes concerning the nature of Christ, the Oriental Orthodox Churches and the Eastern Orthodox Church schismed after the Council of Chalcedon in AD 451, resulting in a rivalry with the Greek Orthodox Church of Alexandria. 

After AD 639, Egypt was ruled by its Islamic conquerors from Arabia. In the 12th century, the church relocated its seat from Alexandria to Cairo. The same century also saw the Copts become a religious minority. During the 14th and 15th centuries, Nubian Christianity was supplanted by Islam. In the 19th and 20th centuries, the larger body of ethnic Egyptian Christians began to call themselves Coptic Orthodox, to distinguish themselves the Catholic Copts and from the Eastern Orthodox, who are mostly Greek. In 1959, the Ethiopian Orthodox Tewahedo Church was granted autocephaly. This was extended to the Eritrean Orthodox Tewahedo Church in 1998 following the successful Eritrean War of Independence from Ethiopia. Since the Arab Spring in 2011, the Copts have suffered increased religious discrimination and violence.

History

Apostolic foundation 

The Egyptian Church is believed to be founded by Mark the Evangelist around AD 42, and regards itself as the subject of many prophecies in the Old Testament. The first Christians in Egypt were common people who spoke Egyptian Coptic. There were also Alexandrian Jewish people such as Theophilus, the same name addressed in the introductory chapter of the Gospel of Luke, though it is unclear who the author refers to. When the church was founded during the reign of the Roman emperor Nero, a great multitude of native Egyptians (as opposed to Greeks or Jews) embraced the Christian faith.

Coptic language in the Church 
The Coptic language is a universal language used in Coptic churches in every country. It descends from Ancient Egyptian and uses the Coptic alphabet, a script descended from the Greek alphabet with added characters derived from the Demotic script. Today, Coptic is used primarily for liturgical purposes. Many of the hymns in the liturgy are in Coptic and have been passed down for several thousand years. The language is used to preserve Egypt's original language, which was banned by the Arab invaders, who ordered Arabic to be used instead. However, most Copts speak Arabic, the official language of Egypt. Hence, Arabic is also used in church services nowadays. The service books, though written in Coptic, have the Arabic text in parallel columns.

Contributions to Christianity

Catechetical School of Alexandria 
The Catechetical School of Alexandria is the oldest catechetical school in the world. Jerome records that the Christian School of Alexandria was founded by Mark himself.

The theological college of the catechetical school was re-established in 1893.

Role and participation in the Ecumenical Councils

Council of Nicaea 

In the 4th century, an Alexandrian presbyter named Arius began a theological dispute about the nature of Christ that spread throughout the Christian world and is now known as Arianism. The Ecumenical Council of Nicea AD 325 was convened by Constantine after the Pope Alexander I of Alexandria requested to hold a Council to respond to heresies, under the presidency of Hosius of Cordova to resolve the dispute. This eventually led to the formulation of the Symbol of Faith, also known as the Nicene Creed.

Council of Constantinople 

In the year AD 381, Pope Timothy I of Alexandria presided over the second ecumenical council known as the Ecumenical Council of Constantinople, to judge Macedonius, who denied the Divinity of the Holy Spirit. This council completed the Nicene Creed with this confirmation of the divinity of the Holy Spirit:

We believe in the Holy Spirit, the Lord, the Giver of Life, who proceeds from the Father, who with the Father and the Son is worshiped and glorified who spoke by the Prophets and in One, Holy, Catholic, and Apostolic church. We confess one Baptism for the remission of sins and we look for the resurrection of the dead and the life of the coming age, Amen

Council of Ephesus 

Another theological dispute in the 5th century occurred over the teachings of Nestorius, the Patriarch of Constantinople who taught that God the Word was not hypostatically joined with human nature, but rather dwelt in the man Jesus. As a consequence of this, he denied the title "Mother of God" (Theotokos) to the Virgin Mary, declaring her instead to be "Mother of Christ" Christotokos.

The Council confirmed the teachings of Athanasius and confirmed the title of Mary as "Mother of God". It also clearly stated that anyone who separated Christ into two hypostases was anathema, as Cyril had said that there is "One Nature for God the Word Incarnate" (Mia Physis tou Theou Logou Sesarkōmenē). The introduction to the creed is formulated as follows:

We magnify you O Mother of the True Light and we glorify you O saint and Mother of God (Theotokos) for you have borne unto us the Saviour of the world. Glory to you O our Master and King: Christ, the pride of the Apostles, the crown of the martyrs, the rejoicing of the righteous, firmness of the churches and the forgiveness of sins. We proclaim the Holy Trinity in One Godhead: we worship Him, we glorify Him, Lord have mercy, Lord have mercy, Lord bless us, Amen.

Council of Chalcedon 

Coptic Christians were part of the larger Byzantine Church until the Council of Chalcedon. When, in AD 451,  Emperor Marcian attempted to heal divisions in the Church, the response of Pope Dioscorus–the Pope of Alexandria who was later exiled–was that the emperor should not intervene in the affairs of the Church. It was at Chalcedon that the emperor, through the imperial delegates, enforced harsh disciplinary measures against Pope Dioscorus in response to his boldness. In AD 449, Pope Dioscorus headed the 2nd Council of Ephesus, called the "Robber Council" by Chalcedonian historians. It held to the Miaphysite formula which upheld the Christology of "One Incarnate Nature of God the Word" (Greek: μία φύσις Θεοῦ Λόγου σεσαρκωμένη (mia physis Theou Logou sesarkōmenē)).

In terms of Christology, the Oriental Orthodox (Non-Chalcedonians) understanding is that Christ is "One Nature—the Logos Incarnate," of the full humanity and full divinity. The Chalcedonians' understanding is that Christ is recognized in two natures, full humanity and full divinity. Oriental Orthodoxy contends that such a formulation is no different from what the Nestorians teach.

From that point onward, Alexandria would have two patriarchs: the non-Chalcedonian native Egyptian one, now known as the Coptic Pope of Alexandria and Patriarch of All Africa on the Holy Apostolic See of St. Mark, and the Melkite or Imperial Patriarch, now known as the Greek Orthodox Patriarch of Alexandria.

Almost the entire Egyptian population rejected the terms of the Council of Chalcedon and remained faithful to the native Egyptian Church (now known as the Coptic Orthodox Church).

By anathematizing Pope Leo because of the tone and content of his tome, as per Alexandrine Theology perception, Pope Dioscorus was found guilty of doing so without due process; in other words, the Tome of Leo was not a subject of heresy in the first place, but it was a question of questioning the reasons behind not having it either acknowledged or read at the Second Council of Ephesus in AD 449. Pope Dioscorus of Alexandria was never labeled as a heretic by the council's canons.
Copts also believe that the Pope of Alexandria was forcibly prevented from attending the third congregation of the council from which he was ousted, apparently the result of a conspiracy tailored by the Roman delegates.

Before the current positive era of Eastern and Oriental Orthodox dialogues, Chalcedonians sometimes used to call the non-Chalcedonians "Monophysites", though the Coptic Orthodox Church in reality regards Monophysitism as a heresy. The Chalcedonian doctrine in turn came to be known as "Dyophysite". A term that comes closer to Coptic Orthodoxy is Miaphysite, which refers to a conjoined nature for Christ, both human and divine, united indivisibly in the Incarnate Logos.

From Chalcedon to the Arab conquest of Egypt

Muslim conquest of Egypt 

The Muslim invasion of Egypt took place in AD 639. Relying on eyewitness testimony, Bishop John of Nikiu in his Chronicle provides a graphic account of the invasion from a Coptic perspective. Although the Chronicle has only been preserved in an Ethiopic (Ge'ez) text, some scholars believe that it was originally written in Coptic. John's account is critical of the invaders who he says "despoiled the Egyptians of their possessions and dealt cruelly with them", and he details the atrocities committed by the Muslims against the native population during the conquest:And when with great toil and exertion they had cast down the walls of the city, they forthwith made themselves masters of it, and put to the sword thousands of its inhabitants and of the soldiers, and they gained an enormous booty, and took the women and children captive and divided them amongst themselves, and they made that city a desolation.

Though critical of the Muslim commander (Amr ibn al-As), who, during the campaign, he says "had no mercy on the Egyptians, and did not observe the covenant they had made with him, for he was of a barbaric race", he does note that following the completion of the conquest, Amr "took none of the property of the Churches, and he committed no act of spoilation or plunder, and he preserved them throughout all his days."

Despite the political upheaval, the Egyptian population remained mainly Christian. However, gradual conversions to Islam over the centuries had changed Egypt from a Christian to a largely Muslim country by the end of the 12th century. Another scholar writes that a combination of "repression of Coptic revolts", Arab-Muslim immigration, and Coptic conversion to Islam resulted in the demographic decline of the Copts. Egypt's Umayyad rulers taxed Christians at a higher rate than Muslims, driving merchants towards Islam and undermining the economic base of the Coptic Church. Although the Coptic Church did not disappear, the Umayyad tax policies made it difficult for the church to retain the Egyptian elites.

Under Islamic rule (640–1800) 

In 969, Egypt entered the Fatimid dynasty (in Egypt from 969 to 1171), who adopted a largely favorable attitude toward the Christians. The major exception to this was the persecution led by Caliph al-Hakim between 1004 and 1013, which included clothing regulations, prohibition of publicly celebrating Christian festivals, and dismissal of Christian and Jewish functionaries. However, at the end of his reign al-Hakim rescinded these measures, allowing the Copts to regain privileged positions within the administration.

The Coptic patriarchal residence moved from Alexandria to Cairo during the patriarchate of Cyril II (1078–92). This move was at the demand of the grand vizier Badr al-Jamali, who insisted that the pope establish himself in the capital. When Saladin entered Egypt in 1163, this ushered in a government focused on defending Sunni Islam. Christians were again discriminated against, and meant to show modesty in their religious ceremonies and buildings.

In 1798, the French invaded Egypt unsuccessfully and the British helped the Turks to regain power over Egypt under the Muhammad Ali dynasty.

From the 19th century to the 1952 revolution 
The position of Copts began to improve early in the 19th century under the stability and tolerance of the Muhammad Ali Dynasty. The Coptic community ceased to be regarded by the state as an administrative unit. In 1855 the jizya tax was abolished by Sa'id Pasha. Shortly thereafter, the Copts started to serve in the Egyptian army.

Towards the end of the 19th century, the Coptic Church underwent phases of new development. In 1853, Pope Cyril IV established the first modern Coptic schools, including the first Egyptian school for girls. He also founded a printing press, which was only the second national press in the country. The Pope established very friendly relations with other denominations, to the extent that when the Greek Patriarch in Egypt had to absent himself from the country for a long period of time, he left his Church under the guidance of the Coptic Patriarch.

The Theological College of the School of Alexandria was reestablished in 1893. It began its new history with five students, one of whom was later to become its dean. Today it has campuses in Alexandria and Cairo, and in various dioceses throughout Egypt, as well as outside Egypt. It has campuses in New Jersey, Los Angeles, Sydney, Melbourne, and London, where potential clergymen and other qualified men and women study many subjects, including theology, church history, missionary studies, and the Coptic language.

Present day 

In 1959, the Ethiopian Orthodox Tewahedo Church was granted its first own Patriarch Abuna Basilios by Pope Cyril VI. Furthermore, the Eritrean Orthodox Tewahedo Church similarly became independent of the Ethiopian Orthodox Tewahedo Church in 1994, when four bishops were consecrated by Pope Shenouda III of Alexandria to form the basis of a local Holy Synod of the Eritrean Church. In 1998, the Eritrean Orthodox Tewahedo Church gained its autocephaly from the Coptic Orthodox Church when its first Patriarch was enthroned by Pope Shenouda III.

Since the 1980s theologians from the Oriental (non-Chalcedonian) Orthodox and Eastern (Chalcedonian) Orthodox churches have been meeting in a bid to resolve theological differences, and have concluded that many of the differences are caused by the two groups using different terminology to describe the same thing.

In the summer of 2001, the Coptic Orthodox and Greek Orthodox Patriarchates of Alexandria agreed to mutually recognize baptisms performed in each other's churches, making re-baptisms unnecessary, and to recognize the sacrament of marriage as celebrated by the other.

In Tahrir Square, Cairo, on Wednesday 2 February 2011, Coptic Christians joined hands to provide a protective cordon around their Muslim neighbors during salat (prayers) in the midst of the 2011 Egyptian Revolution.

On 17 March 2012, the Coptic Orthodox Pope, Pope Shenouda III died, leaving many Copts mourning and worrying as tensions rose with Muslims. Pope Shenouda III constantly met with Muslim leaders in order to create peace. Many were worried about Muslims controlling Egypt as the Muslim Brotherhood won 70% of the parliamentary elections.

On 4 November 2012, Bishop Tawadros was chosen as the 118th Pope as Pope Tawadros II of Alexandria.

Fasts, feasts, liturgy and canonical hours 

Communicants of the Coptic Orthodox Church use a breviary known as the Agpeya to pray the canonical hours at seven fixed prayer times while facing in the eastward direction, in anticipation of the Second Coming of Jesus; this Christian practice has its roots in Psalm 119:164, in which the prophet David prays to God seven times a day. Church bells enjoin Christians to pray at these hours. Before praying, they wash their hands and face to be clean before and present their best to God; shoes are removed to acknowledge that one is offering prayer before a holy God. During each of the seven fixed prayer times, Coptic Orthodox Christians pray "prostrating three times in the name of the Trinity; at the end of each Psalm … while saying the 'Alleluia';" and 41 times for each of the Kyrie eleisons present in a canonical hour. In the Coptic Orthodox Church, it is customary for women to wear a Christian headcovering when praying. The Coptic Orthodox Church observes days of ritual purification. However, while meat that still contains blood after cooking is discouraged from being eaten, the Coptic Church does not forbid its members from consuming any particular type of food, unlike in Islam or Judaism.

All churches of the Coptic Orthodox Church are designed to face the eastward direction of prayer and efforts are made to remodel churches obtained from other Christian denominations that are not built in this fashion.

With respect to Eucharistic discipline, Coptic Orthodox Christians fast from midnight onwards (or at least nine hours) prior to receiving the sacrament of Holy Communion. They fast every Wednesday and Friday of the year (Wednesdays in remembrance of the betrayal of Christ, and on Fridays in remembrance of His crucifixion and death). In total, fast days in a year for Coptic Orthodox Christians numbers between 210 and 240. This means that Copts abstain from all animal products for up to two-thirds of each year. The fasts for Advent and Lent are 43 days and 55 days, respectively. In August, before the celebration of the Dormition of the Mother of God, Coptic Christians fast 15 days; fasting is also done before the feast of Feast of Saints Peter and Paul, starting from the day of Pentecost.

Christmas has been a national holiday in Egypt, since 2003. It is the only Christian holiday in Egypt. Coptic Christmas, which usually falls on January 6 or 7 is a major feast. Other major feasts are Epiphany, Palm Sunday, Easter, Pentecost, Ascension, and Annunciation. These are known in the Coptic world as the Seven Major Feasts. Major feasts are always preceded by fasts. Additionally, the Coptic Orthodox Church also has Seven Minor Feasts: the Circumcision of the Lord, Entrance into the Temple, Entrance into Egypt, Transfiguration, Maundy Thursday, Thomas Sunday, and Great Lent. Furthermore, there are several indigenous feasts of the Theotokos. There are also other feasts commemorating the martyrdom of important saints from Coptic history.

Demographics 
Available Egyptian census figures and other third-party survey reports have not reported more than 4 million Coptic Orthodox Christians in Egypt. However media and other agencies, sometimes taking into account the claims of the Church itself, generally approximate the Coptic Orthodox population at 10% of the Egyptian population or 10 million people. The majority of them live in Egypt under the jurisdiction of the Coptic Orthodox Church. Since 2006, Egyptian censuses have not reported on religion and church leaders have alleged that Christians were under-counted in government surveys. In 2017, a government owned newspaper Al Ahram estimated the percentage of Copts at 10 to 15% and the membership claimed by the Coptic Orthodox Church is in the range of 20 to 25 million.

There are also significant numbers in the diaspora outside Africa in countries such as the United States, Canada, Australia, France, and Germany. The exact number of Egyptian born Coptic Orthodox Christians in the diaspora is hard to determine and is roughly estimated to be close to 1 million.

There are between 150,000 and 200,000 adherents in Sudan.

Persecution 

While Copts have cited instances of persecution throughout their history, Human Rights Watch has noted growing religious intolerance and sectarian violence against Coptic Christians in recent years, and a failure by the Egyptian government to effectively investigate properly and prosecute those responsible. More than a hundred Egyptian copts were killed in sectarian clashes from 2011 to 2017, and many homes and businesses destroyed. In Minya, 77 cases of sectarian attacks on Copts between 2011 and 2016 were documented by the Egyptian Initiative for Personal Rights. Coptic Christian women and girls are often abducted and disappear.

Jurisdiction outside Egypt 

Besides Egypt, the Church of Alexandria has jurisdiction over all of Africa. The following autocephalous churches have strong historical ties to the Coptic Orthodox Church.

Ethiopian Orthodox Tewahedo Church 

The Ethiopian Orthodox Church was dependent on the Coptic Orthodox Church, since its early days. Until the mid-twentieth century, the metropolitans of the Ethiopian church were ethnic Copts. Joseph II consecrated Archbishop Abuna Basilios as the first native head of the Ethiopian Church on 14 January 1951. In 1959, Pope Cyril VI of Alexandria crowned Abuna Basilios as the first Patriarch of Ethiopia.

Eritrean Orthodox Tewahedo Church 

Following the independence of Eritrea from Ethiopia in 1993, the newly independent Eritrean government appealed to Pope Shenouda III of Alexandria for Eritrean Orthodox autocephaly. In 1994, Pope Shenouda ordained Abune Phillipos as first Archbishop of Eritrea.

Episcopal titles

Consolidation of Papal control 

Under the guidance of Pope Shenouda, the church underwent a large transformation that allowed him to hold greater authority than any previous pope. Writing in 2013, the theologian Samuel Tadros stated "Today's Coptic Church as an institution is built solely on his vision".

Modern issues

Internal church disputes

Pope Shenouda and Father Matta El Meskeen 
Pope Shenouda III was criticized by the prominent monk Father Matta El Meskeen for the church's strong links with the Egyptian government under the dictator Hosni Mubarak. As the dispute began to grow, Shenouda explicitly denounced Matta's thoughts, labelling some of his writings "heresies". In turn, Matta promoted a radical focus upon personal faith in contrast to institutional religion and ecclesiastical authority. Shenouda, however, was heavily involved in politics and keen to extend the church's influence over the social lives of Copts.

Father Reweis Aziz Khalil child sexual abuse case 
On 12 July 2020, Sally Zakhari began a series of posts on Facebook and Instagram in which she accused the now defrocked Hegomen Reweis Aziz Khalil of sexual assault when she was between the ages of 11 and 12. Zakhari said that church leaders were aware of several sexual assaults perpetrated by Khalil in his service as a priest across the U.S. for around 22 years, and refused to act on it. The incident sparked other reports of sexual assault and generated debate among church laity, with some in the American Coptic community describing the fallout of the incident as creating a "Coptic #MeToo movement", the #copticsurvivormovement.

Administration 

The Coptic Orthodox Patriarchate of Alexandria is governed by its Holy Synod, which is headed by the Patriarch of Alexandria. Under his authority are the metropolitan archbishops, metropolitan bishops, diocesan bishops, patriarchal exarchs, missionary bishops, auxiliary bishops, suffragan bishops, assistant bishops, chorbishops and the patriarchal vicars for the Church of Alexandria.

See also 

 Pope of Alexandria
 General Congregation Council
List of Coptic Orthodox churches in Egypt
 Copts
 Coptic atheists
 Coptic saints
 Coptic Orthodox churches
 Institute of Coptic Studies
 Coptic Orphans
 Oriental Orthodox Churches
 Orthodox Tewahedo
 Ethiopian Orthodox Tewahedo Church
 Eritrean Orthodox Tewahedo Church
 Christian influences on the Islamic world
 Christianity and Islam
 Christianity in Africa
 Christianity in the Middle East
 Arab Christians
 Holy Family in Egypt
 Zabbaleen
 2011 Alexandria bombing
 Nag Hammadi massacre
 Persecution of Copts

References

Bibliography 

 
 
 
 
 
 
 
 
 
 
 
 
 
 
 Wolfgang Kosack, Novum Testamentum Coptice. Neues Testament, Bohairisch, ediert von Wolfgang Kosack. Novum Testamentum, Bohairice, curavit Wolfgang Kosack. / Wolfgang Kosack. neue Ausgabe, Christoph Brunner, Basel 2014. .

External links 

 Official website

1st-century establishments in Egypt
Apostolic sees
Oriental Orthodoxy in Egypt
 
Members of the World Council of Churches
Christian organizations established in the 1st century